Heliocypha perforata, also known by its common name common blue jewel, is a species of damselfly from the genus Heliocypha.

References

Insects described in 1835
Chlorocyphidae